In music, Op. 16 stands for Opus number 16. Compositions that are assigned this number include:

 Beethoven – Quintet for Piano and Winds
 Brahms – Serenade No. 2
 Britten – Young Apollo
 Chopin – Rondo in E-flat major
 Dvořák – String Quartet No. 7
 Enescu – Piano Quartet No. 1
 Fauré – Berceuse
 Glazunov – Symphony No. 2
 Grieg – Piano Concerto
 Prokofiev – Piano Concerto No. 2
 Saint-Saëns – Suite for Cello and Piano
 Schoenberg – Five Pieces for Orchestra
 Schumann – Kreisleriana
 Scriabin - 5 Preludes
 Shostakovich – Tahiti Trot
 Strauss – Aus Italien
 Suk – Fairy Tale
 Vierne – Messe solennelle
 Zemlinsky – Eine florentinische Tragödie